Dundonald railway station was on the Belfast and County Down Railway which ran from Belfast to Newcastle, County Down in Northern Ireland.

History

The station was opened by the Belfast and County Down Railway on 6 May 1850.

The station closed to passengers on 24 April 1950, by which time it had been taken over by the Ulster Transport Authority.

References 

 
 
 

Disused railway stations in County Down
Railway stations opened in 1850
Railway stations closed in 1950
1850 establishments in Ireland
1950 disestablishments in Northern Ireland

Railway stations in Northern Ireland opened in 1850